The Diocese of Fort Wayne–South Bend is a Latin Church ecclesiastical territory or diocese of the Catholic Church in north-central and northeastern Indiana. The Most Reverend Kevin C. Rhoades was appointed diocesan bishop by Pope Benedict XVI on November 14, 2009, and was installed on January 13, 2010. The Diocese of Fort Wayne–South Bend encompasses 14 Indiana counties: Adams, Allen, DeKalb, Elkhart, Huntington, Kosciusko, LaGrange, Marshall, Noble, Steuben, St. Joseph, Wabash, Wells, and Whitley. The diocese has a co-cathedral setup with the Cathedral of the Immaculate Conception in Fort Wayne as the primary cathedral and Saint Matthew's Cathedral in South Bend as the associate cathedral.

History
The Northwest Territory, first explored by French fur traders, was initially under the jurisdiction of the Bishop of Quebec, until the establishment in 1789 of the Diocese of Baltimore. Rev.John Francis was vicar-general in the West from 1798 until his death in 1804. In 1808, the area came under the newly established Diocese of Bardstown. In 1832, Stephen Badin established a mission at South Bend, Indiana.

In 1834, the Diocese of Vincennes was created, encompassing all of Indiana and the eastern third of Illinois. Simon Bruté of Mount St. Mary's College in Emmitsburg, Maryland, was named the first bishop. In 1835 Bruté was at South Bend in the course of a 600 mile visitation of the diocese. Rev. M. Ruff, from Metz, was assigned to St. Mary's Church in Fort Wayne. Ruff was fluent in English, French, and German. St. Patrick's Roman Catholic Church in Lagro was first constructed in 1838, as was St. Vincent de Paul in Logansport and St. Charles Borromeo in Peru.

Célestin Guynemer de la Hailandière, Bruté's coadjutor and successor, offered land at South Bend to Edouard Sorin of the Congregation of Holy Cross, to build a college. Sorin arrived at the site in November 1842, and began the school using Badin's old log chapel, and thus began the University of Notre Dame. In 1840, Rev. Julian Benoit purchased the land for the Cathedral of the Immaculate Conception. Rev. Benoit routinely covered over a dozen mission stations by canal boat or horseback.

Diocese
In 1857, the Diocese of Fort Wayne (Dioecesis Wayne Castrensis) was erected as suffragan to the Roman Catholic Archdiocese of Cincinnati, from territory formerly part of the Diocese of Vincennes. John Luers was appointed the first bishop. St. Patrick's in Chesterton was founded in 1858, as well as St. Paul's in Valparaiso. In 1863, due to the large German-speaking population in the diocese, he invited the Poor Handmaids of Jesus Christ, a German religious order, to come to the diocese. He established an orphanage in Rensselaer, Indiana for children who had lost their parent during the American Civil War. He also founded the Catholic Clerical Benevolent Association of the Diocese of Fort Wayne for the support of aged and inform priests.

The Sisters of the Holy Family of Nazareth came to the diocese in 1902 to work inn parochial schools. The  Sisters of St. Francis of Maryville arrived in 1906; they had charge of the Wabash Railway hospital at Peru, known as St. Ann's Hospital. The Franciscan Sisters of the Sacred Heart opened Sacred Heart Hospital in Garrett, Indiana in 1901; it later became Garrett Community Hospital. 

In 1944 it became suffragan to the newly elevated Archdiocese of Indianapolis. In 1944 and 1956 it lost territory to the newly formed dioceses of Lafayette and Gary, respectively. In 1960 its name was changed to the Diocese of Fort Wayne–South Bend.

Bishops

Bishops of Fort Wayne
 John Henry Luers (1857–1871)
 Joseph Gregory Dwenger (1872–1893)
 Joseph Rademacher (1893–1900)
 Herman Joseph Alerding (1900–1924)
 John F. Noll (1925–1956) – elevated to Archbishop ad personam in 1953

Bishops of Fort Wayne–South Bend
 Leo Aloysius Pursley (1956–1976) (diocese name changed in 1960)
 William Edward McManus (1976–1985)
 John Michael D'Arcy (1985–2009)
 Kevin Carl Rhoades (2009–present)

Auxiliary bishops
 Leo Aloysius Pursley (1950-1955)
 Joseph Robert Crowley (1971-1990)
 John Richard Sheets, S.J. (1991-1997)
 Daniel R. Jenky, C.S.C. (1997-2002), appointed Bishop of Peoria

Other priests of this diocese who became bishops
 John George Bennett, appointed Bishop of Lafayette in Indiana in 1944
 Andrew Gregory Grutka, appointed Bishop of Gary in 1956

Schools

Colleges and universities
Ancilla Domini College, Donaldson
Holy Cross College, Notre Dame
Saint Mary's College, Notre Dame
University of Notre Dame, Notre Dame
University of Saint Francis, Fort Wayne

High schools
Bishop Dwenger High School, Fort Wayne
Bishop Luers High School, Fort Wayne
Marian High School, Mishawaka
Saint Joseph High School, South Bend

Grade schools
Christ the King, South Bend
Corpus Christi, South Bend
Holy Cross, South Bend
Holy Family, South Bend
Huntington Catholic, Huntington
Most Precious Blood, Fort Wayne
Our Lady School, Fort Wayne
Our Lady of Hungary, South Bend
Queen of Angels, Fort Wayne
Queen of Peace, Mishawaka
Sacred Heart, Warsaw
Saint Adalbert, South Bend
Saint Aloysius, Yoder
Saint Anthony de Padua, South Bend
Saint Bavo, Mishawaka
Saint Bernard, Wabash
Saint Charles Borromeo, Fort Wayne
Saint John the Baptist, Fort Wayne
Saint John the Baptist, New Haven
Saint John the Baptist, South Bend
Saint John the Evangelist, Goshen
Saint Joseph, Garrett
Saint Joseph, Mishawaka
Saint Joseph, South Bend
Saint Joseph (St. Mary of the Assumption), Decatur
Saint Joseph (St. Rose of Lima), Monroeville
Saint Joseph (Hessen Cassel), Fort Wayne
Saint Joseph-St. Elizabeth Ann Seton (St. Joseph, St. Elizabeth Ann Seton), Fort Wayne
Saint Jude, Fort Wayne
Saint Jude, South Bend
Saint Louis (Besançon), New Haven
Saint Mary of the Assumption, Avilla
Saint Mary of the Assumption, South Bend
Saint Matthew Cathedral School, South Bend
Saint Michael, Plymouth
Saint Monica, Mishawaka
Saint Pius X, Granger
Saint Therese, Fort Wayne
Saint Thomas the Apostle, Elkhart
Saint Vincent de Paul, Elkhart
Saint Vincent de Paul, Fort Wayne

Arms

Catholic radio within the diocese
 WRDF "Redeemer Radio" 106.3 FM in Fort Wayne
 WRDI "Redeemer Radio" 95.7 FM in South Bend

Reports of sex abuse
In 2003, a partial list which had been released under Bishop John D'Arcy included the names of 16 priests who were credibly accused of sexually abusing 33 children. On August 17, 2018, Bishop Rhoades announced that he would release the full list of clergy in the Diocese of Fort Wayne–South Bend who were credibly accused of sexual abuse "in a matter of weeks." Rhoades noted that he previously listed the names of three priests who he removed from the Diocese of Fort Wayne–South Bend during his tenure as Bishop due to allegations of sex abuse. On September 18, 2018, Rhoades fulfilled this promise and released the list which revealed the names of 18 priests and deacons who previously served the Diocese and were credibly accused of sexually abusing minors.

Ecclesiastical Province of Indianapolis
See: List of the Catholic bishops of the United States#Province of Indianapolis

See also
 Cathedral of the Immaculate Conception (Fort Wayne, Indiana)

References

Further reading
 Alerding, Herman Joseph. The Diocese of Fort Wayne, 1857-September 1907, Fort Wayne, Indiana., Archer Print Company, 1907
 Blanchard, Charles. History of the Catholic Church in Indiana, A. W. Bowen & Company, 1898

External links
Roman Catholic Diocese of Fort Wayne–South Bend Official Site

 
South Bend, Indiana
Culture of Fort Wayne, Indiana
Roman Catholic Dioceses in Indiana
Religious organizations established in 1857
Fort Wayne–South Bend
Fort Wayne–South Bend
1857 establishments in Indiana